As Young as You Feel is a 1951 American comedy film starring Monty Woolley, Thelma Ritter, and David Wayne, with Marilyn Monroe in a small role. It was directed by Harmon Jones.

Plot
When printer John R. Hodges is forced to retire at age 65 because of a company policy, he decides to do something about it. Dyeing his hair black, he poses as Harold P. Cleveland, the president of his former employer's parent company, and goes on an inspection tour of his old workplace, with the firm's nervous, mystified executives in tow. While walking around the plant, Hodges runs into Joe Elliott, the boyfriend of his granddaughter Alice, and winks at him to let him in on the joke. Afterward, Hodges complains about the lack of experienced, older employees, causing company president Louis McKinley to promise to rescind the retirement policy and rehire all those affected by it within the past year.

However, before he can depart, Hodges finds that McKinley has arranged for him to address the local chamber of commerce. Hodges is up to the challenge, delivering a rousing speech about the virtues of the older worker. He receives a standing ovation, the newspapers praise him, and even the stock market rises on the optimism generated.

Hodges is taken to dinner by McKinley and his neglected wife Lucille. McKinley, it turns out, is more interested in his curvaceous private secretary Harriet. Hodges has a wonderful time, dancing the night away with Lucille. Swept away by his compliments and attention, she fancies herself in love with him. Later that night, she tells her dumbfounded husband that she wants a divorce.

Meanwhile, Joe is unable to convince anybody that Cleveland is actually an impostor. Frank Erickson, his rival for a promotion, and the entire Hodges family – son George, daughter-in-law Della, and Alice – all think Joe is crazy. However, when Hodges returns home with his dyed hair, Joe is vindicated. Because Hodges will be exposed anyway, Della proposes that Joe turn him in so that he can get the promotion, but Joe refuses to do it. The next day, Erickson finally believes Joe and tries to warn their mutual boss Horace Gallagher, but Gallagher thinks Erickson is mentally unstable and gives the promotion to Joe. This enables Joe to finally propose to Alice.

Meanwhile, the real Harold Cleveland is in an awkward position. The speech has done wonders for his and his company's image and even raised the price of the company's stock, but he is unsure of his impostor's motives. When McKinley discovers Hodges' identity and informs Cleveland, he decides to pay him a visit.

Lucille gets there first, but Hodges tells her that he will not come between a man and his wife and that he suspects she is still in love with her husband. McKinley barges in and apologizes to his wife, and the happy couple reconciles and kisses.  As McKinley is leaving he fires Hodges, unbeknown to him that the real Cleveland is in the house with Hodges.

When Cleveland meets Hodges, he is reassured that the old man has no sinister intentions. Cleveland is so impressed that he offers Hodges a job advising him on public relations but gets turned down.  Before Cleveland leaves,  he tells Hodges that a memo will be sent to McKinley the next morning informing him that Hodges is to have his job back.

Cast
 Monty Woolley as John R. Hodges
 Thelma Ritter as Della Hodges
 David Wayne as Joe Elliott
 Jean Peters as Alice Hodges
 Constance Bennett as Lucille McKinley
 Marilyn Monroe as Harriet
 Allyn Joslyn as George Hodges
 Albert Dekker as Louis McKinley
 Clinton Sundberg as Frank Erickson
 Minor Watson as Harold P. Cleveland
 Wally Brown as Horace Gallagher
 Russ Tamblyn as Willie McKinley (as Rusty Tamblyn), the McKinleys' son

Critical response
In his review in Dennis Schwartz Movie Reviews, Dennis Schwartz gave it a "B-" saying that "worth checking out if you care to catch Marilyn Monroe in the beginning".

Musical numbers

Songs

Remake
The story was later filmed for TV as "The Great American Hoax" (1957).

See also
 List of American films of 1951

References

External links 
 
 
 
 
 

American comedy films
1950s English-language films
1951 comedy films
1951 films
American black-and-white films
20th Century Fox films
Films with screenplays by Lamar Trotti
Films directed by Harmon Jones
Films scored by Cyril J. Mockridge
1950s American films